Lauff Island is a small island lying  north of Cape Dart, Siple Island, off the Bakutis Coast of Marie Byrd Land, Antarctica.  Like its neighbor Maher Island, Lauff Island is a tuff cone. It was discovered and photographed from aircraft of U.S. Navy Operation Highjump, 1946–47, and was named by the Advisory Committee on Antarctic Names for Commander Bernard J. Lauff, U.S. Navy, Commanding Officer of  during Operation Deep Freeze, 1956–57.

See also 
 List of Antarctic and sub-Antarctic islands

References

Islands of Marie Byrd Land